Opatovice refers to the following places in the Czech Republic:

 Opatovice (Brno-Country District)
 Opatovice (Přerov District)
 Opatovice I
 Opatovice nad Labem
 Velké Opatovice